Rudravarman IV (?–1147) was a king of Champa during the mid-12th century, at mid of the Angkor invasions of Champa. Rudravarman however has never reigned.

In 1129, king Suryavarman II of the Khmer Empire forced the king of Champa Jaya Indravarman III to join him in campaigns against Dai Viet. The campaign's outcome was of little success with attrition. In 1145 when Indravarman III had made peace with Dai Viet and declined to cooperate with the Khmer, Suryavarman invaded Champa instead. Khmer forces ransacked the capital of Vijaya, deposing Indravarman III.

The kingdom had been plagued in turmoil caused by foreign conquest and social upheavals. As a refugee who had been fleeing Vijaya southward to Panduranga (Phan Rang), Rudravarman had never enjoyed being king, even his own enthronement. His son, prince Sivänandana, "who had been sent to exile and hardship in foreign countries during the time of two previous kings", made a return to Champa, coalescing an army to revolt against Khmer occupants.

Rudravarman died in 1147, while Sivänandana was crowned by his top officials as king Jaya Harivarman I of Champa. Rudravarman was received posthumous title Paramabrahmaloka.

References

Bibliography
 
  
   
 

Kings of Champa
12th-century Vietnamese monarchs
1147 deaths